Juan Ramón Molina (1875–1908) was a national Honduran poet. The National Library Juan Ramón Molina, being the national library of Honduras, was named after him in 2009. In 1954, the Juan Ramón Molina Bridge was built in his honor.

References

1875 births
1908 deaths
19th-century Honduran poets
Honduran male poets
Place of birth missing
19th-century male writers